Translucent paper may refer to:

 Tracing paper
 Colour tracing paper
 Onionskin
 Vellum#Paper vellum